House of Holland may refer to:

 The House of Holland (nobility), rulers of the County of Holland in the Low Countries between the 10th and the 16th century
 House of Holland, a fashion label of Henry Holland (fashion designer), English fashion designer